Dorothy May Pine (1920 – 2011) was an American woman who is likely the first woman in the world to travel to every country.

She was born on April 24, 1920, in Lawrence, Kansas and in later life "when asked what her favorite destination in the world was, her answer would always be Lawrence, Kansas". She had a degree in nutrition from the University of Kansas and was a member of the Kappa Phi sorority.

Her husband was a naval aviator, and the couple lived on many naval bases around the world. In retirement they traveled extensively and in 2006 they were recognised by the Colorado Senate and Colorado House of Representatives as the world's most traveled couple.

She died on August 16, 2011, having suffered from Alzheimer's disease in her last years.

References

Female travelers
20th-century American women
1920 births
2011 deaths
20th-century American people
University of Kansas alumni